Robert Loftin Newman (November 10, 1827 – March 31, 1912) was an American painter and stained-glass designer. He specialized in oil on canvas as his medium. He is sometimes associated with Albert Pinkham Ryder as a painter of mood. His works include Good Samaritan, painted in 1886, Flight into Egypt, Harvest Time, Sailboat Manned by Two Men, and The Bather.

Biography
He was born in Richmond, Virginia and moved to Clarksville, Tennessee when he was 11 years of age. Later, as a young adult, he studied art in New York, England, and France. Newman served briefly as an artillery lieutenant for the Confederate Army during the American Civil War. He died of asphyxiation from a gas leak from a stove on March 31, 1912.

References

External links
Robert Loftin Newman exhibition catalogs

1827 births
1912 deaths
People from Richmond, Virginia
Confederate States Army officers
19th-century American painters
19th-century American male artists
American male painters
20th-century American painters
Deaths from asphyxiation
20th-century American male artists